is a Japanese actress.

Ohta is known for her role as Hitoe Takeuchi in the film Battle Royale II: Requiem. Ohta also filled a minor role in the film Battle Royale: Special Version as one of Mitsuko Souma's childhood friends.

Ohta is one of many actresses who starred as Chibiusa in the Sailor Moon musical.

External links
 Grandpapa's profile on Ohta

21st-century Japanese actresses
1993 births
Living people
Japanese film actresses